Eteinopla is a genus of moths in the family Lasiocampidae. The genus was erected by Yves de Lajonquière in 1979.

Species
Eteinopla obscura De Lajonquière, 1979
Eteinopla signata Moore, 1879

References

Lasiocampidae